Johann Wolfgang Koch (born 18 October 1962) is a German physicist and computer scientist. He teaches applied computer science at the University of Bonn, Germany, and is chief scientist of the Fraunhofer Institute for Communication, Information Processing and Ergonomics. In 2011, Koch was elected a IEEE Fellow and since 2015, he has been an  IEEE Distinguished Lecturer

Life and education 
Koch was born and brought up in Nuremberg, Bavaria, the eldest of three sons of the lawyer, insurance scientist, and manager  and his wife Luise, née Köllner. At RWTH Aachen University, he studied physics and mathematics, graduating in physics (diploma in 1987).

From 2002 to 2010, Koch taught as a lecturer at the chair of Armin B. Cremers on a part time basis and habilitated in the field of applied computer science at the University of Bonn. At the University of Bonn Institute of Computer Science  he has been teaching as an Apl. Professor since 2018, focusing on signal processing, sensor data fusion, artificial intelligence, resource management.

Scientific focus 
For many years, Koch has headed the research department Sensor Data and Information Fusion (SDF) at the Fraunhofer Institute for Communication, Information Processing and Ergonomics, a research institute of the Fraunhofer Society, the largest organization for applied research and development in Europe.

He and his team work predominantly for the German Federal Ministry of Defences with security tasks, including homeland security, and corresponding industrial companies. The work covers  digitization in this environment, such as Intelligence, Surveillance, and Reconnaissance (ISR), electronic & navigation warfare, sensor and platform resource management, mobile and distributed multisensor systems, and aspects of Manned-unManned Teaming (MuM-T). He is also the  single point of contact of the Fraunhofer Segment for Defense and Security (VVS) to the European Future Combat Air System (FCAS). He also represents scientific interests of the German Navy within the framework of the European Defence Fund.

He is one of the initiators and co-chair of the Working Group on Responsible Use of New Technologies in a Future Combat Air System (FCAS),.

Koch is a  member of the Board of Directors of the International Society of Information Fusion (ISIF) and  supports program committees for ISIF's FUSION conference series, and was  Executive Chairman of FUSION 2008 in Cologne, .

Koch is involved in the IEEE Aerospace and Electronics Systems Society (AESS) within the globally operating Institute of Electrical and Electronics Engineers (IEEE) as  an IEEE Fellow, IEEE Distinguished Lecturer, and Member of the Board of Governors,. In 2014, he founded the Germany Section of the IEEE AESS and has been Chapter Chair.

In 2005, Koch founded the annual Sensor Data Fusion – Trends, Solutions, Applications (SDF) event series[9] as a meeting of the fusion community of Germany and neighboring countries, which he also chairs and which has been held annually since 2011 as a peer-reviewed IEEE symposium at the Universitätsclub Bonn and has been a component of the content-related international ISIF-FUSION and IEEE-MFI conferences on several occasions.

Selected publications 

 Tracking and Sensor Data Fusion. Methodological Framework and Selected Applications. Zugl. Habilitation. Springer Nature, Berlin/Heidelberg 2014, .
 Accumulated State Densities and Their Applications in Object Tracking. Chapter 18 in: H. Fourati (Ed.). Multisensor Data Fusion: From Algorithm and Architecture Design to Applications. CRC Press 2016, .
 The Role of Context in Multiple Sensor Systems for Civil Security. Chapter 20 in: L. Snidaro et al. (Eds.). Context Enhanced Information Fusion. Springer Nature, Berlin/Heidelberg 2016, 
 as Ed. with Richard Klemm, Hugh Griffiths: Novel Radar Techniques and Applications. Part II: Target Tracking and Data Fusion. SciTech Publishing, 2017, 
 Zur Ethik der wehrtechnischen Digitalisierung. Informations- und ingenieurwissenschaftliche Aspekte [Ethical Issues in Defense Digitalization. Computer Science and Engineering Espects]. Chapter 1 in: M. Rogg et al. (Eds.). Ethische Herausforderungen digitalen Wandels in bewaffneten Konflikten [Ethical Challenges of Digital Transformation in Armed Conflict.]. German Institute for Defence and Strategic Studies (GIDS), Hamburg 2020,  (E-Book)
 
 Marianisches bei Goethe. fe-Medienverlag, Kißlegg 2021,

References

External links 
 Informatik 4: Wolfgang Koch
 Wolfgang Koch | Aerospace & Electronic Systems Society
 Wolfgang Koch Bio | International Society of Information Fusion

1962 births
Living people
20th-century German physicists
21st-century German physicists
German computer scientists
Academic staff of the University of Bonn
Scientists from Nuremberg
Fellow Members of the IEEE
RWTH Aachen University alumni